Michelle Joseph is a British actress.

Acting career
Joseph is most famous for playing Walford's first lesbian resident, Della Alexander, in the BBC soap opera EastEnders from 1994–1995.

Other acting credits include:
As Time Goes By (1994)
EastEnders (1994–1995)
Thief takers (1996–1997)
Dream Team (1998)
The Bill (2000; 2001)
So What Now? (2001)
A Touch of Frost (2002)
Holby City (2002)
Space Odyssey: Voyage To The Planets (2004)
Messiah (2006)
Perfect Parents (2006)
Doctors (2007)
Apparitions (2008)
Doctors (2012)
Fast Girls (2012)

External links 
 

English soap opera actresses
English television actresses
Living people
Alumni of Rose Bruford College
Black British actresses
English people of Senegalese descent
Year of birth missing (living people)